Ronald Walter Mackelworth (7 April 193015 January 2000) was an English science fiction author (who also worked as an insurance salesman). He was active as a writer in the late 1960s and early 1970s and wrote as R. W. Mackelworth.

Bibliography

Novels
Firemantle (1968, AKA The Diabols (1969))
Tiltangle (1970)
Starflight 3000 (1972)
The Year of the Painted World (1975)
Shakehole (1981)

Short stories
"The Statue" (1963)
"I, the Judge" (1963)
"Pattern of Risk" (1963)
"The Rotten Borough" (1963)
"The Cliff-Hangers" (1963)
"The Unexpected Martyr" (1964)
"The Expanding Man" (1965)
"The Last Man Home" (1965)
"A Cave in the Hills" (1965)
"The Changing Shape of Charlie Snuff" (1965)
"Last Man Home" (1965)
"A Distorting Mirror" (1965)
"Temptation for the Leader" (1965)
"Cleaner than Clean" (1965)
"Final Solution" (1966)
"A Touch of Immortality" (1966)
"The Final Solution" (1966)
"A Visitation of Ghosts" (1966)
"Tilt Angle" (1969)
"Two Rivers" (1970)
"Mr. Nobody" (1971)

General references

1930 births
2000 deaths
English science fiction writers
20th-century English novelists
English male novelists
20th-century English male writers